Alexei Viktorovich Sivakov (Russian: Алексей Викторович Сиваков) (born 7 January 1972 in Moscow) is a former Russian cyclist. He is the father of fellow cyclist Pavel Sivakov.

Palmares
1994
1st  Overall Tour de Serbie
1996
4th National Road Race Championships
1998
1st  Overall Circuito Montañés
1st Stages 1 & 2
2nd National Time Trial Championships
4th Grand Prix de Villers-Cotterêts
2000
3rd National Road Race Championships
2003
2nd Overall Circuit de la Sarthe

References

1972 births
Living people
Russian male cyclists
Cyclists from Moscow